The Broken Shore (2005) is a Duncan Lawrie Dagger award-winning novel by Australian author Peter Temple.

Synopsis
The novel's central character is Joe Cashin, a Melbourne homicide detective. Following serious physical injuries he is posted to his hometown Port Munro, where he begins the process of rebuilding the old family mansion and his physical and mental strength. Against a background of family tragedy, politics, police corruption and racism, he investigates the death of a wealthy local man, Charles Burgoyne. His closest friend and police superior is Villani, who is the central character in Truth.

Style
Written by the award-winning author Peter Temple, the book continues with his trademark stark, staccato dialogue, where superfluous words are removed and the meaning of each sentence must be dug out. In a typical example of Temple's flourish he describes a nearby derelict town as “hardcore [where] – the unemployed, under-employed, unemployable, the drunk and doped, the old-age pensioners, people on all kinds of welfare, the halt, the lame".

Awards

Crime Writers' Association (UK), The Duncan Lawrie Dagger, 2007: winner
Miles Franklin Literary Award, 2006: longlisted
Australian Book Industry Awards (ABIA), Australian General Fiction Book of the Year, 2006: winner
Ned Kelly Awards for Crime Writing, Best Novel, 2006: joint winner
Colin Roderick Award, 2005: winner

Interviews

Time Out New York

Reviews

"The Age" 
"Daily Telegraph"  
"Detectives Beyond Borders" Part 1 , Part 2 
Island Volume 104  accessed 2007-08-13
"Light Reading" 
"Mostly Fiction" 
"Reading Matters" 
"The Times"

Telemovie
The Broken Shore was adapted for television by writer Andrew Knight. It was produced by Ian Collie and Andrew Knight and directed by Rowan Woods. With Don Hany in the lead, it was filmed in Melbourne, Portland, Port Fairy and Port Campbell National Park.

The movie had its world premiere at the Adelaide Film Festival on 15 October 2013. It aired on the ABC on 2 February 2014.  It stars Australian actors Don Hany, Claudia Karvan, and Anthony Hayes.

Cast
 Don Hany as Detective Joe Cashin
 Damon Herriman as Jamie Burgouyne 
 Claudia Karvan as Helen Castleman
 Erik Thomson as Steve Villani
 Anthony Hayes as Hopgood
 Dan Wyllie as Dave Rebb
 Robyn Nevin as Cecily Addison
 Tony Briggs as Paul Dove
 Wayne Blair as Bobby Walshe
 Noni Hazlehurst as Sybil Cashin
 Catherine McClements as Erica Burgouyne
 Mitchell Butel as Liam
 Rick Tonna as Ray Sarris
 Jackson Tozer as T.V Journalist 
 Xavier West as Young Joe Cashin

References

External links
 

2005 Australian novels
Novels by Peter Temple
Novels set in Melbourne
Ned Kelly Award-winning works
Text Publishing books
Australian novels adapted into films